Inishfree refers to two small islands off the coast of County Donegal in the north of Ireland. It is often known simply as "Inishfree".

Inishfree Upper
In the 4th or 5th century, Inishfree Upper was reputedly controlled by Niall of the Nine Hostages, future High King of Ireland. Later, the late medieval period, saw Inishfree as a possession of the descendants of Niall of the Nines Hostages, namely the clan of Red Hugh O'Donnell, the leader of the last stand of the Ulster chieftains against the English.

In the early 20th century there were 36 families living on the island. Séamus Ó Grianna and Peadar O'Donnell each taught at the school there. Peadar O'Donnell was at one point the schoolmaster.

In 1980, the Atlantis commune moved to cottages on Inishfree from Burtonport, where they had set up in 1974. The commune were known as The Screamers for their practice of primal therapy, and subsequently moved near to Icononzo in Colombia in 1989.

The last permanent resident of Inishfree Upper was Barry Pilcher who had moved there in 1993 from Essex and to where he returned in 2013. Because of the possibility that bad weather would stop the votes being counted, Pilcher and residents of nearby islands were the first in Ireland to vote on the Treaty of Lisbon in 2009.  There are still holiday homes in use on the island. In 2016, two people voted in the Irish general election on Inishfree, both of whom had moved to live primarily in Burtonport.

Inishfree Lower
Inishfree Lower is the smaller of the two islands. It was home to one family until the 1960s or 1970s.

Further reading
 "My Introduction to Inishfree" extract from Inishfree – A Tribute To A Donegal Island And Its People by Margaret Duffy.

References

Former populated places in Ireland
Islands of County Donegal
Uninhabited islands of Ireland